Vasyl Hrytsuk (born 21 November 1987 in Kryvyi Rih) is a professional Ukrainian football midfielder who plays for Polissya Zhytomyr.

He is the product of the Kryvbas Kryvyi Rih Youth school system, and played for the club's senior side until 2008.

External links
 
 
 Profile on Football Squads

1987 births
Living people
Sportspeople from Kryvyi Rih
Ukrainian footballers
Ukrainian Premier League players
Ukrainian First League players
FC Kryvbas Kryvyi Rih players
FC Naftovyk-Ukrnafta Okhtyrka players
FC Oleksandriya players
FC Polissya Zhytomyr players
Association football midfielders